Midnight Daddies is a 1930 American pre-Code comedy film directed by Mack Sennett and starring Andy Clyde, Harry Gribbon, and Rosemary Theby. It was the last feature film that Sennett directed: his remaining six films were Bing Crosby shorts.

Cast
 Andy Clyde as Wilbur Louder 
 Harry Gribbon as Charlie Mason aka Charles De Maisone 
 Rosemary Theby as Mrs. Wilbur Louder 
 Addie McPhail as Trixie - Charlie's Sweetheart 
 Alma Bennett as Camille McNab - Vamp 
 Jack Cooper as Lord Rumsberry - Modiste Shop Owner 
 Kathrin Clare Ward as Wilbur's Mother-in-law 
 Vernon Dent as Baron von Twiddlebaum - Designer 
 George Gray as Everett 
 Anna Dodge as 1st Bridge Player 
 Sunshine Hart as 2nd Bridge Player 
 Wade Boteler as Bridge Kibitzer 
 Mary Mayberry as Cigarette Girl
 Iris Adrian as Model

References

Bibliography
 Anthony Balducci. The Funny Parts: A History of Film Comedy Routines and Gags. McFarland, 2014.

External links
 

1930 films
1930 comedy films
1930s English-language films
American black-and-white films
American comedy films
Films directed by Mack Sennett
1930s American films